Daniel Nachev (Bulgarian: Даниел Начев; born 20 September 2003) is a Bulgarian footballer who plays as a midfielder for Spartak Varna.

Considered to be one of biggest talents in Bulgaria, he gained media attention at just the age of 10 and was heavily compared with Lionel Messi and regularly called by the media The Bulgarian Messi.

Career

Youth career
Nachev joined in Septemvri Sofia academy at an early age and gained media attention for first time in 2012 being called the Bulgarian Lionel Messi. In the end of 2013 he moved to Botev Plovdiv academy, but just after few months he returned to Septemvri in 2014. In the same year he had a trials to Manchester City. In 2015 he joined Levski Sofia. He become a captain of the U19 team at age of 17. Despite occasionally training with the first team, in the end of June 2021, Nachev refused to sign a professional contract with Levski as he believed he didn't get enough chances.

Spartak Varna
On 29 June 2021, Nachev signed with Spartak Varna for an undisclosed transfer fee, joining the team until June 2024. He scored his first league goal on 4 August 2021 in match against his youth team of Septemvri Sofia. On 7 September, in a cup match against Nadezhda Dobroslavtsi, he made 2 assists and was named man of the match.

Career statistics

Club

References

External links
 

2003 births
Living people
Bulgarian footballers
Bulgaria youth international footballers
PFC Spartak Varna players
Association football midfielders